Arctostaphylos glutinosa is a species of manzanita known by the common name Schreiber's manzanita. It is endemic to Santa Cruz County, California, where it is known from only a few occurrences on the western slopes of the Santa Cruz Mountains. It grows in the chaparral of the limestone and diatomaceous shale ridges on the coastline.

Description
This is a bristly, glandular shrub reaching heights between 1 and 2 meters. The leaves are greenish gray, densely packed and clasping on the branches. They are up to 5 centimeters long, dull in texture and fuzzy to woolly, with mostly smooth edges except for some teeth near the bases.

The inflorescences are dense with urn-shaped flowers with reddish resin glands inside. The fruit is a hairy red drupe coated in sticky resin.

References

External links
Jepson Manual Treatment
USDA Plants Profile
Local Profile
Photo gallery

glutinosa
Endemic flora of California
Natural history of the California chaparral and woodlands
Natural history of the California Coast Ranges
Natural history of Santa Cruz County, California
~
Plants described in 1940